Between 1914 and either 1963 (Kitaa) or 1974 (Avannaa and Tunu), Danish law deemed the children of unmarried Greenlandic women legally fatherless: having no right to know or inherit from their biological fathers. Many of the fathers were Danish, so the laws, in effect, racially segregated Danish men from their responsibilities and duties in Greenlandic society. Legally-imposed racial segregation existed in some form in Greenland throughout Danish colonial rule, including laws prohibiting miscegenation. An investigative report, commissioned by the Danish government, was released in 2011; three years later, legally fatherless children were awarded the right to sue for paternity and inherit property from their fathers.

Background and laws 
Prior to and during the period of the legal fatherlessness laws, Denmark was the colonial ruler of Greenland. Throughout its rule, Denmark instituted a system racially segregating Danish society from Greenlandic society, including laws prohibiting miscegenation and certain kinds of relationships between Danish men and Greenlandic Inuit women. Throughout the twentieth century, but particularly in the 1950s and 1960s, Danish men temporarily settled in Greenland and fathered children with Greenlandic women. Since their settlement was temporary, many men ultimately left behind children without fathers. 

Early colonial laws (including a 1782 rule and an 1873 revision) required Danish men to pay an annual fee to support their illegitimate children. Between 1890 and 1910, the support rules varied considerably.

In 1914, Denmark began creating a system of legal fatherlessness, where the children of unwed Greenlandic mothers had no right to know or inherent from their fathers. The laws shielded many Danish men from having any responsibility for their Greenlandic children. In effect, they were segregationist. The laws lasted until 1963 in Kitaa, and were repealed in Avannaa and Tunu in 1974. Hundreds of legally fatherless children were born before the laws were replaced.

Activism 
In 2009, Anne Sofie Hardenberg released an autobiography of her experiences as a legally fatherless child (English: The Fight for a Father), and an organization for the legally fatherless was formed, . The next year, the Danish government hired historians from Denmark and Greenland to investigate the issue; their report was published in 2011.

Due to activism and demands by Greenlandic politicians, Denmark fully reversed the legal fatherlessness provisions in 2014. The new law granted the right of Greenlandic children of unwed mothers to inherit from their fathers and sue for paternity. They continue to press for compensation; one group, represented by the same lawyer representing the little Danes experiment survivors, demanded 125,000 kroner in 2022.

References

Citations

Works cited

 
 
 
 

 

Child welfare
Denmark–Greenland relations
Greenlandic law
Law of Denmark